Faheem Khan is a Pakistani politician who had been a member of the National Assembly of Pakistan from August 2018 till January 2023.

Political career
He was elected to the National Assembly of Pakistan from Constituency NA-241 (Korangi Karachi-III) as a candidate of Pakistan Tehreek-e-Insaf in 2018 Pakistani general election.
He is Also President District Korangi When he is elected MNA from the Korangi

References

Living people
Pakistani MNAs 2018–2023
Pakistan Tehreek-e-Insaf politicians
Year of birth missing (living people)